"On the Borderline" is the second single from Bec Cartwright's debut album, Bec Cartwright. It peaked at #29 on the Australian Singles Chart.

Music video
A music video was produced to promote the single.

Track listing
"On the Borderline" (Radio Mix) - 3:21
"On the Borderline" (Real Groover Mix) - 4:43
"On the Borderline" (Fathead Remix) - 4:31
"On the Borderline" (Euph Extended Mix) - 5:03
"On the Borderline" (Karaoke Mix) - 3:19

Charts

References

2003 singles
Bec Hewitt songs
Songs written by Matt Prime